Paul W. Richards (March 16, 1874 – December 17, 1956) was a justice of the Iowa Supreme Court from January 1, 1935, to December 31, 1940, appointed from Keokuk County, Iowa.

References

External links

Justices of the Iowa Supreme Court
1874 births
1956 deaths